Armud Aqachi (also Romanized as Ārmūd Āqāchī; also known as Āmūrd Āqāchī, Ārmūd Āghājī, and Ārmūrd Āghājī) is a village in Sangar Rural District, in the Central District of Faruj County, North Khorasan Province, Iran. At the 2006 census, its population was 289, in 68 families.

References 

Populated places in Faruj County